A list of films produced in France in 1940:

See also
 1940 in France

References

External links
 French films of 1940 at the Internet Movie Database
French films of 1940 at Cinema-francais.fr

1940
Films
French